Joel António Soares Ferreira (born 10 January 1992) is a Portuguese professional footballer who plays for Leixões S.C. as a left-back.

Club career
Born in Porto, Ferreira spent his first four years as a senior with local Gondomar S.C. in the third division. In summer 2015 he signed with C.D. Mafra, making his professional debut on 8 August by playing the full 90 minutes in a 1–1 away draw against Gil Vicente F.C. in the Segunda Liga.

On 21 June 2016, after suffering team relegation, Ferreira signed a three-year deal with G.D. Estoril Praia. He first appeared in the Primeira Liga on 15 August, starting in a 0–2 home loss to C.D. Feirense.

Ferreira returned to the second tier on 12 July 2018, joining Académica de Coimbra. He continued competing at that level the following seasons with Mafra and F.C. Arouca, contributing 22 matches (26 in all competitions) in 2020–21 as the latter club won two promotions in two years to return to the top flight.

On 21 January 2022, after only four official games in the first half of the campaign, Ferreira left the Estádio Municipal de Arouca as a free agent and returned to division two with G.D. Chaves.

References

External links

1992 births
Living people
Portuguese footballers
Footballers from Porto
Association football defenders
Primeira Liga players
Liga Portugal 2 players
Segunda Divisão players
FC Porto players
Padroense F.C. players
Gondomar S.C. players
C.D. Mafra players
G.D. Estoril Praia players
Associação Académica de Coimbra – O.A.F. players
F.C. Arouca players
G.D. Chaves players
Leixões S.C. players